Daniel Köllerer was the defending champion but decided not to participate this year.
Jesse Huta Galung won the title, after defeating Adrian Mannarino 7–6(3), 6–4 in the final.

Seeds

Draw

Finals

Top half

Bottom half

References
 Main Draw
 Qualifying Draw

Trani Cup - Singles
Trani Cup